Abdolreza Mordeh (also Romanized as ʿAbdolrez̤ā Mordeh) is a village in Shahi Rural District, Sardasht District, Dezful County, Khuzestan Province, Iran. At the 2006 census, its population was 22, in 5 families.

References 

Populated places in Dezful County